Blastobasis ochrobathra is a moth in the family Blastobasidae. It is found in Guyana and Florida, United States.

The larvae feed on detritus of Cocos nucifera.

References

Moths described in 1989
Blastobasis